Halaleh-ye Manzel (also Romanized as Halāleh-ye Manzel and Helāleh-ye Manzel) is a village in Shahid Modarres Rural District, in the Central District of Shushtar County, Khuzestan Province, Iran. At the 2006 census, its population was 86, in 11 families.

References 

Populated places in Shushtar County